Damion Lamar Cook (April 16, 1979 – June 26, 2015) was an American football guard. He was signed by the Baltimore Ravens as an undrafted free agent in 2001. He played college football at Bethune–Cookman.

Cook was also a member of the Chicago Bears, Miami Dolphins, Detroit Lions, Cleveland Browns, Hamilton Tiger-Cats and Omaha Nighthawks.

Cook made an appearance on Episode 5 of the 2001 Ravens Hard Knocks, remembered for his performance in the rookie talent show.

Cook died from a heart attack on June 26, 2015 at the age of 36.

References

External links
Just Sports Stats

1979 births
2015 deaths
People from Nashville, Tennessee
American football defensive tackles
American football offensive tackles
American football offensive guards
American players of Canadian football
Canadian football offensive linemen
Bethune–Cookman Wildcats football players
Baltimore Ravens players
Chicago Bears players
Miami Dolphins players
Cleveland Browns players
Hamilton Tiger-Cats players
Tampa Bay Storm players
Detroit Lions players
Omaha Nighthawks players